is the eleventh single by Japanese artist Gackt. It was released on April 24, 2002 under Nippon Crown. It peaked at fourth place on the Oricon weekly chart and charted for five weeks. In 2002, it was the 98th best-selling single, with sales of 132,260 copies, making it Gackt's sixth best selling single.

Track listing

References

2002 singles
Gackt songs
2002 songs
Songs written by Gackt